Rare Tracks may refer to:
 Rare Tracks (Jet album)
 Rare Tracks (Morrissey album)
 Rare Tracks (Sweetbox album)

See also
 Rare Trax, a compilation album by Meshuggah